Mr. Tjung Tin Jan (9 February 1919 – February 1994) or Jani Arsadjaja was an Indonesian politician and lawyer of Chinese Indonesian origin.

Early life and education
Tjung was born in Sungai Selan, part of what is today Central Bangka Regency of Bangka Island, then part of the Dutch East Indies, on 9 February 1919. He studied at a Recht Hogeschool in Batavia, before heading to the Netherlands to study law in the Leiden University, and he received a Master of Laws degree.

Career
After Tjung returned to the Indies, he had worked at a telephone company and became a lawyer before being appointed as a deputy prosecutor in Pangkal Pinang's court. He also founded, and later led, the Bangka branch of the Chinese Association. Additionally, he acted as a legal adviser to a Chinese school in Pangkal Pinang. In 1950, he was appointed as a Senator for the newly formed Senate of the United States of Indonesia, representing Bangka.

In 1950, following the Senate's dissolution and the defederation of the United States of Indonesia, Tjung was appointed to the Provisional People's Representative Council as a "minority representative", alongside several other Chinese Indonesian politicians. He joined the Catholic Party in 1953, and he served in the People's Representative Council as a member of that party until 1960. Within that party, he was a member of its central board between 1953 and 1959, and its deputy general chairman between 1956 and 1958.

During and after his time in the council, Tjung served as a director of several mining companies, including at Aneka Tambang where he was its financial director between 1968 and 1974. He died in February 1994.

Views
Tjung was a proponent of the assimilation of Chinese Indonesians, and was critical of Yap Thiam Hien's writings on discrimination of the group within Indonesia. One example of such a critique was titled Indonesia Bukan Amerika (Indonesia is not the United States), published in 1960, in response to one of Hien's essays earlier that year. In the same year he was also a signatory to the manifesto "Towards voluntary assimilation" published in Star Weekly. This manifesto, which may have been spearheaded by Ong Hok Ham, opposed the politics of integration advanced by Siauw Giok Tjhan and BAPERKI, which advocated for a distinct Chinese identity within a multiethnic Indonesia, and instead called for gradual and consensual assimilation into Indonesian society as a solution to ethnic conflict.

References

1919 births
1994 deaths
Indonesian politicians of Chinese descent
People from the Bangka Belitung Islands
21st-century Indonesian politicians
Leiden University alumni
Indonesian Roman Catholics
Members of the People's Representative Council, 1950
Members of the People's Representative Council, 1955
Members of Senate of the United States of Indonesia